The 1992 NCAA Division I Men's Soccer Tournament was the 33rd organized men's college soccer tournament by the National Collegiate Athletic Association, to determine the top college soccer team in the United States. The Virginia Cavaliers won their third national title, and second straight, by defeating the San Diego Toreros in the championship game, 2–0. The final match was played on December 6, 1992, in Davidson, North Carolina, at Richardson Stadium. All the other games were played at the home field of the higher seeded team.

Early rounds

Final

See also  
 NCAA Division II Men's Soccer Championship
 NCAA Division III Men's Soccer Championship
 NAIA Men's Soccer Championship

References 

NCAA Division I Men's Soccer Tournament seasons
NCAA Division I Men's
NCAA Division I Men's Soccer
NCAA Division I Men's Soccer Tournament